Oppstrynsvatn (also known as Oppstrynsvatnet, Strynevatnet, or Strynevatn) is a lake in the municipality of Stryn in Vestland county, Norway. The villages of Flo, Oppstryn, and Erdal are located on the shores of the lake.

The main outflow of the lake is the river Stryneelva which flows west into the Nordfjorden.

Some of the local attractions include the Jostedalsbreen nasjonalparksenter, Jostedalsbreen National Park, the mountain Skåla, and the glacier Tindefjellbreen.  The Norwegian National Road 15 highway runs along the southern shore of the lake.  Oppstryn Church sits right on the shore overlooking the lake.

Media gallery

See also
List of lakes in Norway

References

Lakes of Vestland
Stryn